Frank Sedgman and Doris Hart were the defending champions, but Sedgman was ineligible to compete after turning professional. Hart partnered with Vic Seixas, and they defeated Enrique Morea and Shirley Fry in the final, 9–7, 7–5 to win the mixed doubles tennis title at the 1953 Wimbledon Championships.

Seeds

  Vic Seixas /  Doris Hart (champions)
  Mervyn Rose /  Maureen Connolly (fourth round)
  Geoffrey Paish /  Jean Rinkel-Quertier (quarterfinals)
  Enrique Morea /  Shirley Fry (final)

Draw

Finals

Top half

Section 1

Section 2

Section 3

Section 4

Bottom half

Section 5

Section 6

Section 7

Section 8

References

External links

X=Mixed Doubles
Wimbledon Championship by year – Mixed doubles